Evans Wise CM (born November 23, 1973) is a Trinidadian former professional footballer who played as a midfielder.

His first professional club was the Tampa Bay Mutiny, who drafted him fourth overall in the 1996 MLS Supplemental Draft.

Wise has 18 caps and three goals for the Trinidad and Tobago national football team. He was called up to for the 2006 FIFA World Cup in Germany, replacing the injured Silvio Spann.

As a member of the squad that competed at the World Cup, Wise was awarded the Chaconia Medal (Gold Class), the second highest state decoration of Trinidad and Tobago.

References

External links

1973 births
Living people
Trinidad and Tobago footballers
Association football midfielders
Trinidad and Tobago international footballers
2000 CONCACAF Gold Cup players
2006 FIFA World Cup players
1996 CONCACAF Gold Cup players
Major League Soccer players
Bundesliga players
USL League Two players
A-League (1995–2004) players
MCCC Vikings men's soccer players
Tampa Bay Mutiny players
New England Revolution players
MLS Pro-40 players
SSV Ulm 1846 players
SV Elversberg players
SV Wacker Burghausen players
Joe Public F.C. players
SV Waldhof Mannheim players
Fredericksburg Hotspur players
RVA FC players
Recipients of the Chaconia Medal
Tampa Bay Mutiny draft picks
Trinidad and Tobago expatriate footballers
Expatriate footballers in Germany
Expatriate soccer players in the United States